Roscoe is an unincorporated community and census-designated place in Keith County, Nebraska, United States. As of the 2010 census it had a population of 63.

Geography
Roscoe is in east-central Keith County in the valley of the South Platte River. U.S. Route 30 passes through the community, leading west  to Ogallala, the Keith county seat, and east  to Paxton.

Demographics

History
Roscoe got its start in the 1870s when the railroad was extended to that point.

References

Census-designated places in Keith County, Nebraska
Census-designated places in Nebraska